Joanna Phillips-Lane is a British actress who among other parts, played the character Roxy in Carla Lane's sitcom Bread. She also played the character Wendy Foley in Capital City.

External links

British television actresses
Year of birth missing (living people)
Living people
Place of birth missing (living people)
20th-century British actresses